Leo Cooper Watson (30 July 1885 – 21 November 1961) was a New Zealand cricketer. He played one first-class match for Otago in 1911/12. His brother, Harold, also played cricket for Otago.

See also
 List of Otago representative cricketers

References

External links
 

1885 births
1961 deaths
Cricketers from St Helens, Merseyside
New Zealand cricketers
Otago cricketers